Carlos Adriano de Jesus Soares (10 April 1984 – 8 July 2007), better known as Alemão, was a Brazilian football player. He died in 2007 of injuries sustained in a car accident in Nova Iguaçu.

Club statistics

References

External links

jsgoal

1984 births
2007 deaths
People from Nova Iguaçu
Road incident deaths in Brazil
Brazilian footballers
Association football forwards
Campeonato Brasileiro Série A players
J1 League players
J2 League players
Coritiba Foot Ball Club players
Kyoto Sanga FC players
Yokohama FC players
Sociedade Esportiva Palmeiras players
Brazilian expatriate footballers
Brazilian expatriate sportspeople in Japan
Expatriate footballers in Japan
Afro-Brazilian sportspeople
Sportspeople from Rio de Janeiro (state)